XHPZAM-FM is a radio station on 98.1 FM in Zamora, Michoacán, with transmitter in adjoining Jacona. It carries the Exa FM pop format from MVS Radio.

History
XHPZAM was awarded in the IFT-4 radio auction of 2017 to TV Rey de Occidente, a cable company in Zamora now trading as Ilox Telecomunicaciones. The station went on air November 28 of that year.

References

Radio stations in Michoacán
Radio stations established in 2017
2017 establishments in Mexico